Bemokotra is a town and commune in Madagascar. It belongs to the district of Maevatanana, which is a part of Betsiboka Region. The population of the commune was estimated to be approximately 5,000 in 2001 commune census.

Only primary schooling is available. The majority 70% of the population of the commune are farmers, while an additional 22% receives their livelihood from raising livestock. The most important crop is rice, while other important products are peanuts and sweet potatoes.  Services provide employment for 1% of the population. Additionally fishing employs 7% of the population.

References and notes 

Populated places in Betsiboka